The Portland Park Bridge, also known as South Branch Goose River Bridge, near Portland, North Dakota is a Pratt through truss structure that was built in 1919 over the south branch of the Goose River. It was listed on the National Register of Historic Places. It was removed from the National Register in 2004.

References

Road bridges on the National Register of Historic Places in North Dakota
Bridges completed in 1919
Transportation in Traill County, North Dakota
National Register of Historic Places in Traill County, North Dakota
Steel bridges in the United States
Girder bridges in the United States
1919 establishments in North Dakota
Former National Register of Historic Places in North Dakota
Bridges over the Goose River (North Dakota)